Kim Song-gil is a North Korean general. He is serving as the commander of the Korean People's Navy.

Biography
Very little information is known about him. He served in the 9th Squadron in Chodori, Nampo-si, and then served in the staff of the West Sea Fleet. On February 24, 2021, at the 1st expanded meeting of the 8th Central Military Commission of the Workers' Party of Korea, his predecessor Kim Myong-sik was dismissed, and he was promoted to lieutenant general of the navy and appointed as the new commander of the navy.

References

North Korean generals
Workers' Party of Korea politicians
Admirals
Living people
Korean People's Navy officers
Year of birth missing (living people)